The 2018 Soul Train Music Awards took place on November 17 at the Orleans Arena in Las Vegas, Nevada. The ceremony aired on BET and BET Her on November 25, and was hosted by Tisha Campbell & Tichina Arnold, honoring artists in 12 different categories. During the award ceremony soul singer Erykah Badu was honored with the Legend Award while Faith Evans received the Lady of Soul Award for her contributions to the music industry.

Special Awards
Honorees are as listed below:

Legend Award
Erykah Badu

Lady of Soul Award
Faith Evans

Nominees
Nominees are as listed below. Winners are in bold:

Best New Artist
Daniel Caesar
Jorja Smith
Kali Uchis
Leon Thomas
Normani
Queen Naija

Soul Train Certified Award
Ledisi
Ashanti
Jorja Smith
Lenny Kravitz
MAJOR.
Tamia

Best R&B/Soul Female Artist
Ella Mai
Beyoncé
H.E.R.
Mariah Carey
SZA

Best R&B/Soul Male Artist
Bruno Mars
Childish Gambino
Daniel Caesar
John Legend
Khalid
Tank

Best Gospel/Inspirational Award
Lecrae
Andra Day
Kirk Franklin
Snoop Dogg
Tori Kelly

Rhythm & Bars Award (Best Hip-Hop Song Of The Year)
Drake – "In My Feelings"
Cardi B – "I Like It" 
Childish Gambino – "This is America"
DJ Khaled – "No Brainer" 
The Carters – "Apeshit"

Song Of The Year
Ella Mai – "Boo'd Up"
Bruno Mars – "Finesse (Remix)" 
H.E.R. – "Every Kind of Way"
SZA – "The Weekend"
The Internet – "Come Over"

Album/Mixtape Of The Year
H.E.R. – H.E.R.
Chloe x Halle – The Kids Are Alright
Chris Brown – Heartbreak on a Full Moon
Leon Bridges – Good Thing
Miguel – War & Leisure
The Internet – Hive Mind

The Ashford And Simpson Songwriter's Award
Ella Mai – "Boo'd Up" 
Written by Ella Howell, Dijon McFarlane, Joelle James & Larrance Dopson
Bruno Mars – "Finesse" (Remix) 
Written by Gene Hernandez, Belcalis Almanzar, Christopher Brody Brown, James Fauntleroy, Philip Lawrence, Ray McCullough, Klenord Raphael, Jeremy Reeves, James Yip & Ray Romulus
Childish Gambino – "Summertime Magic"
Written by Donald Glover and Ludwig Göransson   
Daniel Caesar – "Best Part" 
Written by Ashton Simmonds, Gabi Wilson, Riley Bell, Matthew Burnett, Jordan Evans
H.E.R. – "Focus"
Written by Gabi Wilson, Darhyl Camper & Justin Love
SZA – "Broken Clocks"
Written by Solána Rowe, Cody Fayne, Adam Feeney, Ashton Simmonds & Thomas Paxton-Beesley

Best Dance Performance
Ciara – "Level Up"
Bruno Mars – "Finesse" (Remix) 
Chris Brown – "Tempo"
HoodCelebrityy – "Walking Trophy"
Janet Jackson – "Made for Now"

Best Collaboration Performance
Daniel Caesar – "Best Part" 
Bruno Mars – "Finesse" (Remix) 
John Legend – "A Good Night" 
Khalid – "OTW" 
SZA – "Doves in the Wind"

Video Of The Year
Bruno Mars – "Finesse" (Remix) 
Ella Mai – "Boo'd Up"
H.E.R. – "Avenue"
SZA – "Broken Clocks"
The Internet – "Come Over"

Multiple nominations and awards

The following received multiple nominations:

The following received multiple awards:

References 

Soul
Soul Train Music Awards
Soul
Soul
Soul Train Music Awards 2018